Julianne Henner (born May 13, 1970) is an American former middle-distance runner. She competed in the women's 1500 metres at the 1996 Summer Olympics. She was born in El Paso, Texas.

References

External links
 

1970 births
Living people
Sportspeople from El Paso, Texas
Track and field athletes from Texas
American female middle-distance runners
Olympic track and field athletes of the United States
Athletes (track and field) at the 1996 Summer Olympics
20th-century American women
Universiade medalists in athletics (track and field)
Universiade silver medalists for the United States
Athletes (track and field) at the 1995 Pan American Games
Pan American Games competitors for the United States